The Clere School is a small co-educational community secondary school in Burghclere. Although its postcode locates to Reading via Newbury, it is in Hampshire, England. The current Acting Headteacher is Rob Milner, who has held the position since January 2023. The school caters for academic years 7 to 11, but does not have a Sixth Form.

History
In 1966 the old boys school in Kingsclere, which had been established in c. 1542 and rebuilt in 1820 and 1861 and became the Secondary Modern School, moved to Burghclere, becoming The Clere School. Among the school equipment taken from Kingsclere to Burghclere was a 1934 "Y" Model Ford, which was used outside school hours in the playground by boys learning to drive.

It gained Specialist Technology College status in September 2003, changed its name to The Clere School and Technology College, and held an official launch of the status on 13 November 2003 with Sir George Young. With the ending of the specialist schools programme in 2011 the school reverted to its former name.

On the afternoon of 7 November 2012, a fire was discovered outside the school's Sports Hall. Local fire crews attended the incident, and prevented the fire from spreading to the inside of the building. The fire resulted in damage to the roof of the building, and several solar panels which were mounted on it.

Notable former pupils
Layke Anderson, actor and film director, attended from 1995 to 2000.
Jamie Hince, guitarist with The Kills, attended from 1980 to 1985.
Craig Maskell, former professional footballer, attended from 1979 to 1984.

References

External links
 Clere School official website

Secondary schools in Hampshire
Community schools in Hampshire
1542 establishments in England